James W. Dillon House is a historic home located at Dillon, Dillon County, South Carolina. It was built in 1890, and is a two-story, white frame Late Victorian style dwelling.   A one-story veranda extends across the façade and three-fourths of the southeast elevation. Other notable details include lattice work, carved posts with cornice braces, scalloped shingles in gables, and an ornate front gable with gingerbread trim. It was the home of James W. Dillon, founder of the town and man for whom the county was named.

It was listed on the National Register of Historic Places in 1971.

The house is owned by the Dillon County Historical Society and operated as an early 20th-century period historic house museum.

References

External links
 Dillon County Historical Society

Houses on the National Register of Historic Places in South Carolina
Victorian architecture in South Carolina
Houses completed in 1890
Houses in Dillon County, South Carolina
National Register of Historic Places in Dillon County, South Carolina
Museums in Dillon County, South Carolina
Historic house museums in South Carolina